Vesht is a village in Gamasiyab Rural District, in the Central District of Nahavand County, Hamadan Province, Iran. At the 2006 census, its population was 231, in 62 families.

References 

Populated places in Nahavand County